DIN 276 is a DIN standard used in architectural engineering for two main services:
 To determine the project costs
 To determine the fee for architects and engineers

Scope
Only part 1 building construction (last updated 2008–12) and part 4 engineering are valid.

"This part of the standard applies to cost planning in building construction, in particular for the determination and organization of costs. It covers the costs of new construction, reconstruction and modernization of buildings and related project-related costs; for building construction costs , DIN 18960 applies."

With the new edition of DIN 276-1 of December 2008, amendment A1 of February 2008 and amendment 1 of February 2007 were incorporated into the standard.

The version of April 1981 of DIN 276 is used in the HOAI 1996/2002 for fee determination. The old version is used, because the federal legislature did not follow the further development of DIN 276 in the price law for architects and engineers and did not adapt the cost groups in the regulation text of the HOAI 1996. The cost calculations are thus to be set up in two structures: in the most recent for project processing and in the version of 1981 only for fee determination.

General changes to the new edition 2006 
In 2006, changes were made to the title and structure to open the standard beyond building construction to other areas of construction. Compared with DIN 276: 1993–06, the following changes were made:

Substantive changes
The principles of costing have been extended to principles of cost planning
For the term "cost", principles of application have been formulated
The principles of costing have been redefined with the goal of greater cost-effectiveness
The costing stages have been extended and redrafted with a view to continuous cost planning
For cost control principles of application have been formulated

Editorial changes
The scope of the standard has been redrafted in line with the changed content
The terms have been changed and supplemented according to the state of the art
The structure of the cost breakdown remains unchanged; the description has been changed editorially
The execution-oriented breakdown of costs has been retained as an alternative; Table 2 has been deleted
The presentation of the cost breakdown has been editorially revised according to the state of the art
Annex A has been deleted.

References

 Klaus D. Siemon: Baukostenplanung für Architekten. 3. Aufl. Vieweg, Wiesbaden 2005, .
 Peter J. Fröhlich: Hochbaukosten – Flächen – Rauminhalte. 16., überarb. und akt. Aufl. Vieweg + Teubner, Wiesbaden 2010, .
 Udo Blecken, Willi Hasselmann: Kosten im Hochbau, Praxis. Handbuch und Kommentar zur DIN 276. Rudolf Müller, 2007, .
 Willi Hasselmann, Klaus Liebscher: Normengerechtes Bauen. Kosten, Grundflächen und Rauminhalte von Hochbauten nach DIN 276 und DIN 277. Rudolf Müller, 2007, 

276